James Charles (born 1999) is an American YouTuber and makeup artist.

James Charles may also refer to:
 James Charles (painter) (1851–1907), British impressionist artist
 James Charles (footballer) (1851–1939), Australian footballer, Richmond Football Club administrator
 Sir James Charles (sea captain) (1865–1928), British ocean-liner captain

See also
 
 Charles James (disambiguation)